Fusion – Live in London is a concert film by Electric Light Orchestra, recorded at the New Victoria Theatre in London on 20 June 1976. The concert was a part of the band's Face the Music tour. It was released in VHS format in 1990 (Pickwick PTR 2152).

Aside from Out of the Blue: Live at Wembley, this is the only concert footage of the classic lineup known to exist (with Zoom Tour Live and a VH1 Storytellers appearance from 2001 forming the only other pieces of live footage). This provides a rare look at ELO before the Out of the Blue tour, lacking the vast UFO stage (which caused numerous performance and filming difficulties) as well as CBS' often intrusive video editing techniques.

On 9 August 2010 the concert finally saw its official DVD release by Eagle Rock Entertainment in the UK as a part of their compilation Live - The Early Years, then in the United States in 24 August 2010 as a slightly edited release.

Track listing
"Poker"
"Nightrider"
"Showdown"
"Eldorado Overture"
"Can't Get It Out of My Head"
"Poorboy (The Greenwood)"
"Illusions in G Major"
"Strange Magic"
"10538 Overture"/"Do Ya"
"Evil Woman"
"Ma-Ma-Ma-Belle"
"Roll Over Beethoven"

Some songs from the concert were missing from the final release, including "Eldorado", "Eldorado Finale", "Fire on High", and some solos.

Personnel
Jeff Lynne - guitars and vocals
Bev Bevan - drums, percussion, backing vocals
Richard Tandy - electric piano, Minimoog, mellotron, grand piano
Kelly Groucutt - bass guitar, vocals
Mik Kaminski - violin
Hugh McDowell - cello
Melvyn Gale - cello, piano

References

Electric Light Orchestra video albums
1990 live albums
Live video albums
1990 video albums